This is an incomplete list of Whitney Biennial artists selected for the Whitney Biennial exhibitions of contemporary American art, at the Whitney Museum of American Art in New York City, United States. The event began as an annual exhibition in 1932, the first biennial was in 1973. The Whitney show is generally regarded as one of the leading shows in the art world, often setting or leading trends in contemporary art.

1973

1975

1977

1979

1981

1983

1985

1987

1989

1991

1993

1995

1997

2000
The curators were Whitney museum director Maxwell L. Anderson, Michael Auping, Valerie Cassel, Hugh M. Davies, Jane Farver, Andrea Miller-Keller, and Lawrence R. Rinder.

2002

2004
The curators were Chrissie Iles, Shamim M. Momin, Debra Singer.

2006
The 73rd Whitney Biennial. The curators were Philippe Vergne and Chrissie Iles.

2008
The 74th Whitney Biennial.

2010
The 75th Whitney Biennial/Annual ran February 25 to May 30, 2010. The curators were Francesco Bonami and associate Gary Carrion-Murayari.

2012
The 76th Whitney Biennial/Annual ran March 1 through May 27, 2012. It was curated by Elisabeth Sussman and Jay Sanders. They co-curated the film program with Thomas Beard and Ed Halter, co-founders of Light Industry, a venue for film and electronic art in Brooklyn.

2014
The 77th Whitney Biennial was on view March 7 through May 25, 2014. The exhibition was curated by Stuart Comer, Anthony Elms, and Michelle Grabner.

2017
The 2017 Biennial is the first to take place in the museum's much larger new location in the Meatpacking District. With 63 participants the exhibition runs from March 17 until June 11, and is co-curated by Christopher Y. Lew and Mia Locks.

2019
The Biennial participating artists were announced in February 2019. Curated by Rujeko Hockley and Jane Panetta, the show is open from May 17 to September 22, 2019. One artist, Michael Rakowitz, turned down the invitation to participate in response to the presence of the Whitney's vice chair at the time, Warren Kanders, CEO of Safariland. In mid-July 2019, eight artists requested for their work to be withdrawn from the 2019 Whitney Biennial in response to additional concerns over Safariland's manufacturing of tear gas and police equipment. Kanders resigned from his position on the board July 25, 2019.

2022

The 2021 Whitney Biennial was postponed till 2022 due to the COVID-19 pandemic. The 2022 Whitney Biennial is curated by David Breslin and Adrienne Edwards.

See also
List of Whitney Biennial curators

References

External links
1973 Biennial, Whitney Archives 
1969 Annual, Whitney Archives
1967 Annual, Whitney Archives

Visual arts awards
Awards established in 1932
Whitney Museum of American Art
Cultural heritage of the United States
American art
Art exhibitions in the United States
People associated with the Whitney Museum of American Art
Whitney
Artists